Ankyrin repeat domain-containing protein 24 is a protein in humans that is coded for by the ANKRD24 gene. The gene is also known as KIAA1981. The protein's function in humans is currently unknown. ANKRD24 is in the protein family that contains ankyrin-repeat domains.

Gene

Locus 

The gene is located on chromosome 19 at p13.3 on the forward strand. The gene is 4041 base pairs in length and contains 29 exons. The gene is neighbored by the gene SIRT6 that encodes for the Sirtuin-6 protein and the EBI3 gene that encodes for the Epstein-Barr virus induced gene 3 protein.

Expression 
The expression pattern of ANKRD24 is uncharacterized. Under conditions of cell growth and proliferation, the expression levels increase. In germ line tumors, glioma, and prostate cancer, the expression is elevated relative to other disease states. During development, the expression level is elevated in the blastocyst stage. In adults, there are elevated levels of expression in the placenta, stomach, kidneys, and eye relative to other tissues. However, the results of experimental gene expression profiles are inconsistent relative to ANKRD24 expression, suggesting redundancy of the gene and its protein product.

mRNA

Alternative expression 
13 transcription splice variants of ANKRD24 mRNA have been predicted.

Protein

General features
The ANKRD24 protein is 1146 amino acids in length, has a molecular weight of 124kDa, and has an isoelectric point of 4.98. The secondary structure is predicted to consist of all alpha helices and to not contain any beta strands. The tertiary structure of the protein is predicted to be a helical twist.

Composition 
ANKRD24 has a relatively high composition of alanine (15.0%), glutamic acid (13.5%), and leucine (11.0%) and a relatively low composition of cysteine (1.5%), phenylalanine (0.7%), tryptophan (0.2%), and tyrosine (0.8%). The protein contains positive run clusters that could be nuclear localization signals. The protein does not have any significant negative charge clusters and no significant charge patterns.

Subcellular localization
The ANKRD24 protein is predicted to localize in the nucleus of cells.

Domains 
ANKRD24 is in the protein family that contains ankyrin-repeat domains. Ankyrin repeats are known for mediating protein-protein interactions. The protein also contains two coiled-coil regions.

Post-translational modification
ANKRD24 is predicted to undergo C-mannosylation.

Interacting proteins
ANKRD24 is predicted to interact with disks large homolog 4 (DLG4), eukaryotic translation elongation factor 1-alpha 1 (EEF1A1), unc-119 homolog A (UNC119), replication timing regulatory factor 1 (RIF1), protein kinase C and casein kinase substrate in neurons 1 (PACSIN1), nuclear factor NF-kappa-B p105 subunit (NFKB1), cholest-5-ene-3β,7α-diol 3β-dehydrogenase (HSD3B7), lethal giant larvae homolog 2 (L2GL2), and glucocorticoid induced 1 (GLC)CI1. No characterization of these interactions has yet to be observed.

Homology 

ANKRD24 has no human paralogs. Orthologous proteins are found in other organisms. The following table represents some of the orthologs found using searches in BLAST and BLAT. However, this list is not exhaustive for the orthologs of ANKRD24 and is only meant to display the wide diversity of species for which orthologs of ANKRD24 can be found.

References